Tyranny of Souls is the sixth studio album released by Iron Maiden vocalist Bruce Dickinson on 23 May 2005. The cover art is one of the panels of Earthly Vanity and Divine Salvation, a work by renaissance artist Hans Memling. It is his first solo album since rejoining Iron Maiden in 1999 and his most recent studio album as a solo artist to date.

The songwriting on the album was split between Roy Z and Dickinson. During composition, Roy sent recordings of riffs to Dickinson, who was on tour with Iron Maiden. Dickinson subsequently wrote lyrics and melodies. Roy also served as the album's producer and played all guitar parts as well as some supplemental bass guitar and piano parts.

The other players on the album were all connected to Roy Z through different projects. Z, bassist Ray "Geezer" Burke, and keyboardist Maestro Mistheria all contributed to vocalist Rob Rock's 2003 release, Eyes of Eternity. Drummer Dave Moreno and bassist Juan Perez were members of Z's Latin rock band Tribe of Gypsies at the time.

"Kill Devil Hill" is inspired by the successful flight by the Wright brothers in 1903 (see Kill Devil Hills).

"Navigate the Seas of the Sun" is inspired by Erich Von Däniken's theory about extraterrestrial presence on Earth long ago and about man dealing with that in the future. 

The title track is somewhat based on Shakespeare's tragedy MacBeth, and includes direct quotes and lines from the play throughout the song.

Track listing

Personnel
Musicians
Bruce Dickinson – lead vocals
Roy Z – guitars, bass guitar (tracks 7, 9), producer, engineer, mixing
Dave Moreno – drums
Ray "Geezer" Burke – bass guitar (tracks 1, 4-6, 8, 10)
Juan Perez – bass guitar (tracks 2, 3)
Maestro Mistheria – keyboards

Production
Hatch Inagaki – second engineer
Stan Katayama – mixing
Jeff Wakolbinger – mixing assistant
Tom Baker – mastering at Precision Mastering, Los Angeles

Charts

Notes

References

2005 albums
Bruce Dickinson albums
Sanctuary Records albums
Albums produced by Roy Z